Sher Bahadur may refer to:
Sher Bahadur Deuba (born 1946), Former Prime Minister of Nepal
Sher Bahadur Kunwor, Member of Nepalese Parliament
Sher Bahadur Thapa (1921–1944), Nepalese Victoria Cross holder 
Sher Bahadur Singh (died 2020), Indian politician
Sher Bahadur Tamang, Nepalese politician